Ballet is a formalized kind of performance dance.

Ballet may also refer to:

 Ballet company, a group of dancers who perform ballet 
 Ballet dancer, individual performer

Music
 Ballet (music), a form of musical composition that corresponds to the dance form
 "Le ballet" (Celine Dion song), 1996
 "Le ballet", song by Patrick Juvet, 1979

Film
 Ballet (film), a 1995 documentary by Frederick Wiseman about the American Ballet Theater

People with the surname
 Bernard Ballet (1941–2022), French actor and director
 Élisabeth Ballet (born 1956), French sculptor
 Françoise Ballet-Blu (born 1964), French politician
 Gilbert Ballet (1853–1916), French psychiatrist, neurologist and historian
 Pascale Ballet (born 1953), French Egyptologist
 René Ballet (1928– 2017), French journalist, novelist and essayist
 William Ballet, 17th Century English composer

See also 
 Ballet terms
 Balat (disambiguation)